, also written as (126154) 2001 YH140, is a resonant trans-Neptunian object discovered on 18 December 2001, by American astronomers Chad Trujillo and Michael Brown at the Palomar Observatory in California. It measures approximately 345 kilometers in diameter.

Orbit and rotation

 is locked in 3:5 mean-motion resonance with Neptune. When it makes three revolutions around the Sun, Neptune makes exactly five.

Physical characteristics
As a result, its size has been estimated to be .

References

External links
 

126154
Discoveries by Michael E. Brown
Discoveries by Chad Trujillo
20011218